Ornithogalum pyrenaicum, also called Prussian asparagus, wild asparagus, Bath asparagus, Pyrenees star of Bethlehem, or spiked star of Bethlehem, is a plant whose young flower shoots may be eaten as a vegetable, similar to asparagus.

The common name Bath asparagus comes from the fact it was once abundant near the city of the same name in England.

References

pyrenaicum
Stem vegetables
Flora of the Pyrenees
Plants described in 1753
Taxa named by Carl Linnaeus